Heriberto Moreno Borges Tavares (born 19 February 1997) is a Portuguese professional footballer who plays for Spanish club SD Ponferradina on loan from F.C. Famalicão as a forward.

Club career

Benfica
Born in Amadora, Lisbon metropolitan area of Cape Verdean descent, Tavares played youth football with three clubs in the country's capital, including Sporting CP from ages 10 to 18. He made his senior debut with S.L. Benfica's reserves on 6 August 2016, featuring 71 minutes in the 1–1 LigaPro home draw against C.D. Cova da Piedade.

Tavares scored a career-best 14 goals in the 2017–18 season, but the B team could only finish in 13th position. Highlights included braces in home victories over Varzim SC (2–1), Real Massamá (3–0) and C.F. União (2–1).

On 25 July 2018, Tavares was loaned to Moreirense FC. He played his first match in the Primeira Liga on 12 August, scoring in a 1–3 home loss to Sporting and also committing a penalty which resulted in the opposition's second goal. He repeated the feat the following round, helping to a 2–1 away defeat of C.D. Nacional.

For the 2019–20 campaign, Tavares signed with Boavista F.C. also on loan.

Brest
Tavares moved to the French Ligue 1 on 2 August 2020, signing a four-year contract with Stade Brestois 29 on a free transfer. He made his league debut 21 days later, playing 22 minutes in the 4–0 loss at Nîmes Olympique.

Famalicão
On 11 January 2021, Tavares was loaned to F.C. Famalicão until 30 June. He was bought outright in July, fracturing his left foot in December and being sidelined for three months.

On 31 August 2022, Tavares was loaned to Spanish side SD Ponferradina for one year.

International career
Across all youth levels, Tavares won 20 caps for Portugal and scored seven goals. He made his under-21 debut on 14 November 2017, coming on as a second-half substitute for Diogo Jota in a 2–1 home win against Switzerland for the 2019 UEFA European Championship qualifiers. The following 11 October, in the same stage, he netted four times in the 9–0 demolition of Liechtenstein.

References

External links

Portuguese League profile 

1997 births
Living people
People from Amadora
Portuguese sportspeople of Cape Verdean descent
Sportspeople from Lisbon District
Black Portuguese sportspeople
Portuguese footballers
Association football forwards
Primeira Liga players
Liga Portugal 2 players
C.F. Estrela da Amadora players
Sporting CP footballers
C.F. Os Belenenses players
S.L. Benfica B players
Moreirense F.C. players
Boavista F.C. players
F.C. Famalicão players
Ligue 1 players
Stade Brestois 29 players
Segunda División players
SD Ponferradina players
Portugal youth international footballers
Portugal under-21 international footballers
Portuguese expatriate footballers
Expatriate footballers in France
Expatriate footballers in Spain
Portuguese expatriate sportspeople in France
Portuguese expatriate sportspeople in Spain